Thermanaeromonas burensis is a species of Gram-positive, non-motile, endospore-forming bacteria belonging to the family Thermoanaerobacteraceae that was isolated from a low-permeability argillaceous rock layer, at a depth of 490 m, in northern
France. This species is thermophilic, strictly anaerobic, halotolerant, and can reduce thiosulfate.

References

Thermoanaerobacterales
Thermophiles
Anaerobes
Bacteria described in 2016